East Carondelet is a village in St. Clair County, Illinois, United States. The population was 499 as of the 2010 census.

Geography

Demographics

As of the census of 2000, there were 267 people, 94 households, and 68 families residing in the village. The racial makeup of the village was 92.51% White, 3.37% African American, 1.87% Native American, 0.37% from other races, and 1.87% from two or more races.

There were 94 households, out of which 37.2% had children under the age of 18 living with them, 54.3% were married couples living together, 16.0% had a female householder with no husband present, and 26.6% were non-families. 22.3% of all households were made up of individuals, and 7.4% had someone living alone who was 65 years of age or older. The average household size was 2.84 and the average family size was 3.28.

In the village, the population was spread out, with 29.6% under the age of 18, 6.4% from 18 to 24, 26.6% from 25 to 44, 25.5% from 45 to 64, and 12.0% who were 65 years of age or older. The median age was 36 years. For every 100 females, there were 92.1 males. For every 100 females age 18 and over, there were 91.8 males.

The median income for a household in the village was $36,071, and the median income for a family was $39,583. Males had a median income of $35,500 versus $21,875 for females. The per capita income for the village was $13,402. About 3.8% of families and 2.9% of the population were below the poverty line, including 6.3% of those under the age of eighteen and 8.3% of those 65 or over.

Historic sites
East Carondelet is the site of the Martin–Boismenue House, a c. 1790 house owned by the Illinois Historic Preservation Agency.

References

Villages in St. Clair County, Illinois
Villages in Illinois
Illinois populated places on the Mississippi River